American musician Kid Cudi has recorded material for 10 studio albums (including two collaborative albums), three extended plays (EPs), in addition to one mixtape, and has been featured on songs on other artists' respective albums. After gaining major recognition with his debut single "Day n Nite" and his breakout mixtape A Kid Named Cudi, he went on to sign a record deal with GOOD Music, and subsequently began working on his major-label debut, Man on the Moon: The End of Day.

Non-album songs

Freestyle songs

Unreleased songs

Notes

References

External links
 
 
 
 

Kid Cudi
Lists of unreleased songs by recording artists

s